John Collett Ryland (1723–1792) was an English Baptist minister and author.

Life
The son of Joseph Ryland, a farmer of Lower Ditchford in Gloucestershire, and Freelove Collett of Slaughter, he was born at Bourton-on-the-Water on 12 October 1723. He was baptised in 1741 by Benjamin Beddome, who sent him about 1744 to Bernard Foskett's dissenting academy at Bristol to prepare for the Baptist ministry. He left Bristol in 1750 to be pastor of the Baptist church at Warwick, where he had already preached for four or five years. Here he kept school in St. Mary's parsonage-house, rented from the rector, Dr. Tate.

In October 1759 Ryland left Warwick for Northampton, where he lived 26 years as minister and schoolmaster. Among his many pupils was Samuel Bagster the Elder. His church was twice enlarged, and in 1781 his son John Ryland joined him as co-pastor. In 1786 he passed to his son the care of the church, and moved his school to Enfield, where it prospered. This was the school attended by the Romantic poet John Keats (1795-1821) and his brothers George and Tom.

Ryland frequently preached in the neighbourhood. He is said to have once addressed from a coach-box, in a seven-storied wig, holiday crowds assembled on the flat banks of the River Lea, near Ponder's End. He was massive in person, and his voice in singing was compared to the roaring of the sea. The degree of M.A. was conferred on him in 1769 by Brown University, founded in 1765.

Ryland died at Enfield on 24 July 1792, and was buried at Northampton, his funeral sermon being preached by John Rippon and published. An elegy by "Legatus" also appeared (London, 1792).

Works
Ryland published to the point of money troubles, and as his friends James Hervey and Augustus Toplady told him, he would have done more if he had done less. With James Ferguson he issued An Easy Introduction to Mechanics, 1768, and A Series of Optical Cards. He contributed to the Baptist Register edited by John Rippon, wrote many of the articles for Charles Buck's Theological Dictionary, London, 1802, and edited Edward Polhill's Christus in Corde, Francis Quarles's Emblems, Jonathan Edwards's Sermons (1780), and Cotton Mather's Student and Preacher (1781).

Ryland's own publications (issued at London unless otherwise stated) were:

Memoir of J. Alleine, 1766; 2nd ed. 1768.

Contemplation on the Nature and Evidences of Divine Inspiration, Northampton, 1776. These last three, with additions, were republished (Northampton, 1779) with portrait, as Contemplations on the Beauties of Creation; 3rd ed. 3 vols. Northampton, 1780. 
The Preceptor or Counsellor of Human Life, 1776.

Character of James Hervey, with Letters, 1790.
A Translation of John Owen's Demonstrations of Divine Justice, 1790.
A Picture of Popery, prefixed to Luther's Discourses by Capt. Henry Bell; 2nd ed. 1791.

Evidences that the Christian Religion is of God; 2nd ed. 1798.
Select Essays on the Moral Virtue, and on Genius, Science, and Taste, 1792.

On 2 July 1784 he delivered at sunrise over the grave of Andrew Gifford in Bunhill Fields an Oration which was published. It was reprinted in 1834 and 1888.

Family
Ryland was twice married: first, on 23 December 1748, to Elizabeth Frith of Warwick (died 1779); and secondly to Mrs. Stott, widow of an officer. John Ryland (1753–1825) and Herman Witsius Ryland were sons by his first wife.

Notes

Further reading
 Naylor, Peter: John Collett Ryland (1723-1792) in Michael Haykin (ed) British Particular Baptists volume 1: Springfield, Missouri: Particular Baptist Press 1998 

Attribution

1723 births
1793 deaths
English Baptist ministers
English writers
People from Bourton-on-the-Water
English male writers